Bradley Edwin Guzan (born September 9, 1984) is an American professional soccer player who plays as a goalkeeper for Major League Soccer club Atlanta United FC.

A college soccer second-team All-American for the South Carolina Gamecocks, Guzan was second overall pick in the 2005 MLS SuperDraft, signing for Chivas USA, with whom he was the 2007 MLS Goalkeeper of the Year. In July 2008, he joined Premier League club Aston Villa for a fee of $1 million, where he made 171 total appearances across eight seasons. After a brief spell at Middlesbrough, he returned to MLS with Atlanta United in January 2017.

Guzan made his senior debut for the United States national team in 2006, earning over 60 caps. He was named in their squads for two FIFA World Cups and four CONCACAF Gold Cups, winning the latter in 2007, 2017 and 2021. He also featured for them at the 2008 Olympics, the 2007 Copa América, the 2009 FIFA Confederations Cup and the Copa América Centenario.

Youth and college soccer
Born in Evergreen Park, Illinois, Guzan, who is of Polish-American ancestry, played in his youth at the Chicago Magic Soccer Club and for the varsity soccer team at Providence Catholic High School in Illinois, from which he graduated in 2003. He went on to play two seasons in NCAA competition as a member of the South Carolina Gamecocks men's soccer team, where he was a second-team All-American in his sophomore season.

Club career

Chivas USA
After spending two years with the Chicago Fire Reserves in the USL Premier Development League, he chose to forgo the rest of his college years, signing a Generation Adidas contract with Major League Soccer (MLS). Chivas USA later drafted Guzan with the second overall pick of the 2005 MLS SuperDraft. On November 7, 2007, Guzan was named MLS Goalkeeper of the Year. During his time at Chivas USA, Guzan was affectionately nicknamed "El Gusano."

Aston Villa

On July 11, 2008, Aston Villa agreed a transfer fee in the region of £600,000, or $1 million, with MLS and Chivas USA to sign Guzan, significantly less than the £2 million agreed to in Aston Villa's failed move for the keeper in January 2008, the difference this time being that Guzan would have been out of his contract at the end of the 2008 season in November, allowing him to sign for Aston Villa during the January transfer window on a free transfer.

On August 1, 2008, Guzan was granted a work permit by the Home Office, allowing him to complete his move to Aston Villa. He was due to be officially introduced by Aston Villa after competing for the United States at the 2008 Summer Olympics in Beijing. Guzan was the second American goalkeeper called Brad to be signed during the summer by Aston Villa, following the capture of Premier League veteran Brad Friedel.

Guzan made his Aston Villa debut in September 2008 in the League Cup at home to Queens Park Rangers. He made his European soccer debut in the UEFA Cup game away at Slavia Prague on November 6, 2008. The match finished 1–0 to Aston Villa, with Guzan making several saves to keep a clean sheet. His performance led to his manager Martin O'Neill describing him as a "class goalkeeper in the making." He also started in Aston Villa's first leg against CSKA Moscow in the round of 32 of the UEFA Cup at Villa Park on February 18, 2009, also later appearing as a substitute against Liverpool after Friedel's red card.

Guzan played in every game that Aston Villa won during their success in the 2009 Peace Cup, against Atlante, Porto and Juventus. He then helped Aston Villa overcome the Italians in the final, most notably in the penalty shootout during which he saved the attempts of Vincenzo Iaquinta and Alessandro Del Piero. The only game that Aston Villa did not win (in the group stages against Málaga) was the one in which Guzan did not feature.

Despite having a successful pre-season period, Guzan was dropped from the first team in favor of Friedel for Aston Villa's opening game of the 2009–10 season against Wigan Athletic. On October 27, 2009, Guzan saved four penalties in one match, one in normal time and three more in a penalty shoot-out win over Sunderland at the Stadium of Light in the last 16 of the League Cup. Despite these heroics, however, Friedel replaced him in goal for the final against Manchester United.

Hull City (loan)

On December 31, 2010, Guzan was loaned to Football League Championship side Hull City on a one-month loan deal. He made his debut for Hull on New Year's Day 2011, a 1–0 loss to Leicester City. His second appearance for the club ended on a higher note, as his team went on to win 2–3 at Portsmouth. He kept his first clean sheet for the club against Barnsley in a 2–0 win for Hull.
On January 25, Guzan extended his loan until the end of February. He made a total of 11 league appearances for Hull before returning to Aston Villa on February 28.

On March 8, however, Hull re-signed Guzan on an emergency loan deal due to an injury to goalkeeper Vito Mannone. Guzan's first appearance back at the club was in a home match against Burnley. Guzan's last game for Hull City came in a 1–2 win away at Watford on April 9, 2011, after which he returned to Aston Villa.

Return to Aston Villa
On December 3, 2011, Guzan made his second Premier League appearance for Aston Villa, coming on for the injured Shay Given against Manchester United. Given had been ruled out for a month with a torn hamstring so Guzan retained his place in the first team, giving him an extended run in Aston Villa's first team.

Guzan was released by Villa at the end of his contract in June 2012. However, he was linked with a return to the club over the summer in a situation similar to that of fellow Aston Villa goalkeeper Andy Marshall in 2010. On July 16, 2012, Guzan was included in new manager Paul Lambert's 25-man squad for Aston Villa's tour of the United States and on the same day, the player confirmed via Twitter that he had renewed his contract and rejoined the club.

He made his return for Aston Villa against Newcastle United putting in a Man of the Match performance in a 1–1 draw at St James' Park. He kept Villa's first clean sheet of the season in a 2–0 win against Swansea City and performed well enough to keep his position in the starting lineup. At the end of the 2012–13 Premier League season, he was voted the Aston Villa Player of the Year thanks to his large contribution to Villa's bid to avoid relegation. On July 6, 2013, Guzan was rewarded for his play and signed a four-year contract extension with the Midlands club.

On July 18, 2013, Guzan stated that he hoped to give Aston Villa the best years of his career and said that signing a new contract was a "no-brainer."

On September 28, 2013, Guzan remarkably earned an assist on an Andreas Weimann goal in a 3–2 win over Manchester City in which Paul Lambert praised Guzan's distribution technique for goal kicks.

During the 2014–15 season, Guzan was dropped by new Aston Villa manager Tim Sherwood after a high-profile error against Manchester City gifted Sergio Agüero the opening goal in a 3–2 defeat on April 25, 2015, with Shay Given taking his place for the final games of the Premier League season. Guzan also missed out on Aston Villa's run to the 2015 FA Cup Final, with Given playing in every round.

Middlesbrough
On July 29, 2016, Guzan signed a two-year contract with newly-promoted Premier League club Middlesbrough, joining on a free transfer, after Aston Villa were relegated to the Championship. He made his league debut for the club in a 2–1 win away at Sunderland.

Atlanta United

On January 26, 2017, it was confirmed that Guzan had signed a contract with recently formed MLS team Atlanta United on a free transfer, and would return to the United States following the conclusion of the 2016–17 Premier League season, after nine years in English football. He left Middlesbrough on June 10, 2017. For the remainder of the 2017 MLS season, Guzan wore the number 1 shirt. Guzan made his Atlanta United debut on July 24, 2017, a 1–0 road victory against Orlando City SC. During the 2017 MLS season, Guzan started 14 games, posted a 6–1–7 record, and kept eight clean sheets. He led the MLS in save percentage (79.2%) and won MLS Save of the Week three times. In 2018 Guzan won the MLS Cup with Atlanta United after a 2–0 victory over the Portland Timbers.

International career

Guzan made his United States national team on February 19, 2006 in a friendly 4–0 win over Guatemala in Frisco, Texas. He played the first 80 minutes before being replaced by fellow debutant Zach Wells. He was a non-playing member of the side that won the 2007 CONCACAF Gold Cup. He was called up for the 2007 Copa América in Venezuela, where he played in a 1–0 loss to Colombia for his next cap on July 5.

Guzan made his World Cup qualifying debut in the second leg of a second round qualifier against Barbados on June 14, 2008 in an 8–0 home victory. Weeks later, he was chosen for the Olympic team for the tournament in China, where he kept a shutout in an opening 1–0 win over Japan. When the United States came runners-up at the 2009 FIFA Confederations Cup in South Africa, he played in a 3–0 group victory against Egypt that put the team into the semi-finals at the expense of their opponents and Italy.

Guzan was unused at the 2010 FIFA World Cup and played no international games between that November and May 2012, when he came on as a substitute for Tim Howard near the end of a 5–1 friendly win over Scotland in Jacksonville.  Howard took an international sabbatical after starting at the 2014 FIFA World Cup, during which Guzan was first-choice. At the 2015 CONCACAF Gold Cup, in which the United States came fourth, Guzan and Michael Bradley were the only two Americans to start every game; he won the Golden Glove. Howard returned to the team for 2016's Copa América Centenario, but Guzan kept his place in a run to the semi-finals.

Guzan was in the American side that won the 2017 CONCACAF Gold Cup. He played the first two group games before Bill Hamid took his place for the third, then he and Sean Johnson were replaced in the squad by Howard and Jesse González. He was unused as the Americans won again in 2021.

Personal life
Guzan is a Christian. Guzan has spoken about his faith, saying, "My personal life, my faith life and my sport life – they all come together. I think they have to. You don't have one without the others, and you have to have Jesus in your life. That is how I get through my personal life, how I get through my professional life – following Christ. ... we all need Christ in our lives. Money, fame, all those objects, they don't mean anything if you don't have Jesus in your life. All of those things can be gone in the blink of an eye. We can't get caught up in it."

Career statistics

Club

Honors
Aston Villa
FA Cup runner-up: 2014–15
Football League Cup runner-up: 2009–10

Atlanta United
MLS Cup: 2018
U.S. Open Cup: 2019
Campeones Cup: 2019

United States
CONCACAF Gold Cup: 2007, 2017, 2021
FIFA Confederations Cup runner-up: 2009

Individual
MLS Best XI: 2007
MLS Goalkeeper of the Year: 2007
Aston Villa Player of the Season: 2012–13
CONCACAF Gold Cup Golden Glove: 2015
MLS All-Star: 2018, 2019

References

External links

 
 
 

1984 births
Living people
American people of Polish descent
People from Evergreen Park, Illinois
Sportspeople from the Chicago metropolitan area
Soccer players from Illinois
American soccer players
Association football goalkeepers
South Carolina Gamecocks men's soccer players
Chicago Fire U-23 players
Chivas USA draft picks
Chivas USA players
Aston Villa F.C. players
Hull City A.F.C. players
Middlesbrough F.C. players
Atlanta United FC players
USL League Two players
Major League Soccer players
Major League Soccer All-Stars
Premier League players
English Football League players
United States men's under-23 international soccer players
Olympic soccer players of the United States
United States men's international soccer players
2007 CONCACAF Gold Cup players
2007 Copa América players
Footballers at the 2008 Summer Olympics
2009 FIFA Confederations Cup players
2010 FIFA World Cup players
2014 FIFA World Cup players
2015 CONCACAF Gold Cup players
Copa América Centenario players
2017 CONCACAF Gold Cup players
2021 CONCACAF Gold Cup players
CONCACAF Gold Cup-winning players
American expatriate soccer players
American expatriate sportspeople in England
Expatriate footballers in England